Jean-Marie Alexandre is a French politician, who, from 1987 until 1994, was a Member of the European Parliament representing France for the Socialist Party.

Parliamentary Service
Vice-Chair, Committee on Regional Policy and Regional Planning (1989–1992)
Vice Chair, Delegation for Relations with the Gulf States (1992–1994)

References

Living people
1946 births
Socialist Party (France) MEPs
MEPs for France 1984–1989
MEPs for France 1989–1994